Tyler Township may refer to:

Tyler Township, Perry County, Arkansas
Tyler Township, Prairie County, Arkansas
Tyler Township, Hickory County, Missouri
Tyler Township, Craig County, Oklahoma (historical)

Township name disambiguation pages